Paul Butcher is an American actor. He is known for portraying Dustin Brooks in Zoey 101 (2005–2008).

Career
Paul Butcher portrayed Dustin Brooks, the younger brother of lead character Zoey Brooks, for the four seasons of the Nickelodeon comedy series Zoey 101. He has had guest and other minor roles for a number of movies and TV shows, one of the most notable roles being a guest star in the Season 5 Premiere of Criminal Minds. He also played the role of young Walter in the 2007 film The Number 23. He made his acting debut at age 7 on a 2001 episode of The Bernie Mac Show. At the age of 5, Paul appeared in the Rascal Flatts music video Prayin' for Daylight. He also was an extra in four sketches on Chappelle's Show.

Filmography

References

External links

21st-century American male actors
21st-century Christians
American Christians
American male child actors
American male film actors
American male television actors
American male voice actors
Living people
Male actors from Los Angeles
University of California, Los Angeles alumni